The Musée Jules Verne is a museum dedicated to the French writer Jules Verne. It is located in the city of Nantes, France, and was opened in 1978 to mark the 150th anniversary of Verne's birth. The painter Jean Bruneau, helped by Luce Courville, curator of the municipal library, joined forces to open this museum.

Description 

The museum is housed in a late 19th century building overlooking the river Loire. While Verne never lived in the building, its surroundings reflect the atmosphere which influenced his work. His parents had a house in nearby Bas-Chantenay.

A large collection of artifacts, replicas of his inventions, and memorabilia inspired by his writings can be found in the museum. The museum is divided into eight themed rooms:

 Jules Verne's drawing room; featuring chairs and the clock from his own drawing room. His china on display in the room was donated to the City of Nantes by Verne's descendants. Throughout his career, Verne received the china as gifts from foreign journalists.
 The start of dreams
 The sea, the sea
 The two Jules
 Known and unknown worlds
 The Voyagers on stage
 Reading and games room
 Audiovisual room

The building was renovated in 2005, the centenary of Verne's death. Consequence of the transformation of the urban community into a metropolis, it becomes a metropolitan facility on January 1, 2015.

Location 
The museum is located at 3, rue de l'Hermitage, Nantes.

Gallery

References

External links 
 
 Musée Jules Verne on Nantes Tourist Office website

Literary museums in France
Verne, Jules
Jules Verne
Museums in Nantes